For the Summer Olympics, there are 29 venues that have been or will be used for wrestling.

See also

References

 
Wrestl
Venues
Olympic